The 7th Division is an infantry unit of the Nigerian Army.

History 
The 7th Division (also known as JTF-RO) was established in August 2013 for the war against Boko Haram. The creation of the new division brought to six the number of divisions. The 7th division is headquartered in Maiduguri. The division includes a combat motorcycle unit as part of its 25th Task Force Brigade. The purpose of this unit is stated as securing roads in Yobe and serving as a force multiplier in combat operations.

In 2014, the 7th Division mutinied after having suffered heavy losses during the Chibok ambush.

References

External link 
 

Military units and formations of Nigeria
2013 establishments in Nigeria
Military units and formations established in 2013